The Ruling Class is a 1972 British black comedy film. It is an adaptation of Peter Barnes' satirical stage play The Ruling Class which tells the story of a paranoid schizophrenic British nobleman (played by Peter O'Toole) who inherits a peerage. The film co-stars Alastair Sim, William Mervyn, Coral Browne, Harry Andrews, Carolyn Seymour, James Villiers and Arthur Lowe. It was produced by Jules Buck and directed by Peter Medak.

The film has been described as a "commercial failure ... [that] has since become a cult classic";  Peter O'Toole described it as "a comedy with tragic relief".

Plot
Following the death from accidental asphyxiation of Ralph Gurney, the 13th Earl of Gurney, Jack Gurney becomes the 14th Earl of Gurney. Jack, a paranoid schizophrenic, thinks he is Jesus Christ and shocks his family and friends with his talk of returning to the world to bring it love and charity, not to mention his penchant for breaking out into song and dance routines and sleeping upright on a cross. When faced with unpalatable facts (such as his identity as the 14th Earl), Jack puts them in his "galvanized pressure cooker" and they disappear. His unscrupulous uncle, Sir Charles, marries him to his mistress, Grace, in hopes of producing an heir and putting his nephew in an institution; the plan fails, however, when Grace falls in love with Jack. Jack gains another ally in Sir Charles' wife, Lady Claire, who hates her husband and befriends Jack just to spite him. She also begins sleeping with Jack's psychiatrist, Dr. Herder, to persuade him to cure Jack quickly.

Herder attempts to cure him through intensive psychotherapy, to no avail; Jack so thoroughly believes that he is the "God of Love" that he dismisses any suggestion to the contrary as insane. The night his wife goes into labour, Herder makes a last effort at curing Jack; he introduces Jack to McKyle, a patient who also believes himself to be Christ – or as the patient puts it, "The High Voltage Messiah" – who subjects an unwitting Jack to electroshock therapy. The plan works, and as Grace is delivered of a healthy baby boy, Jack proclaims "I'm Jack, I'm Jack". His family takes this to mean that he has returned to his senses, but in reality he now believes himself to be Jack the Ripper.

Sir Charles sends for a court-appointed psychiatrist to evaluate Jack, confident that his nephew will be sent to an asylum for life. He is once again thwarted when the psychiatrist discovers that Jack was a fellow Old Etonian, bonds with him and declares him sane.

Jack murders Lady Claire in a fit of rage when the aging woman tries to seduce him. He frames the Communist family butler, Tucker, for the murder. Sir Charles suffers a debilitating stroke shortly afterward, and Dr. Herder has a nervous breakdown upon realizing what Jack has done. Jack assumes his place in the House of Lords with a fiery speech in favour of capital and corporal punishment. His colleagues applaud wildly, completely unaware the speech is the ranting of a lunatic. When seen through his eyes, his colleagues – singing "Onward, Christian Soldiers" – appear to be rotting corpses. Their enthusiasm contrasts with the unfavourable reaction when Jack believed he was Christ. That night, he murders Grace for expressing her love for him. Her terrified scream is matched by the sound of a baby cooing "I'm Jack, I'm Jack", suggesting that their son – the heir presumptive – has inherited Jack's madness.

Cast

 Peter O'Toole – Jack Gurney, 14th Earl of Gurney
 Coral Browne – Lady Claire
 William Mervyn – Sir Charles
 James Villiers – Dinsdale, Sir Charles and Lady Claire's son
 Arthur Lowe – Tucker
 Alastair Sim – Bishop Lampton
 Carolyn Seymour – Grace
 Michael Bryant – Dr. Herder
 Graham Crowden – Dr. Truscott
 Harry Andrews – Ralph Gurney, 13th Earl of Gurney
 Hugh Owens – The toastmaster
 Hugh Burden – Matthew Peake
 Henry Woolf, Griffith Davies, Oliver McGreevy – Inmates
 Kay Walsh – Mrs. Piggott-Jones
 Patsy Byrne – Mrs. Treadwell
 Nigel Green – McKyle
 Cyril Appleton, Leslie Schofield – McKyle's assistants
 Joan Cooper – Nurse Brice
 Declan Mulholland – A poacher
 James Grout – Inspector Brockett
 James Hazeldine – Fraser
 Ronald Adam, Julian D'Albie, Llewellyn Rees – Lords
 Kenneth Benda – Lord Chancellor

Production
O'Toole held the rights to Barnes's play; Peter Medak approached O'Toole repeatedly about exercising those rights. According to Medak, the project got started one night that he and O'Toole were returning from the theatre, which "meant stopping at every pub between Soho and Hampstead, and it didn't matter if it was after closing hour because he would knock on the door and just say 'Peter's here,' and every door opened for him". Later on, at O'Toole's apartment, the deeply inebriated actor phoned his manager and said, "I'm with the crazy Hungarian and I know I'm drunk but I give you 24 hours to set this movie up." The next day, Medak received a call from United Artists and a deal was put together to shoot The Ruling Class.

Peter Barnes adapted the screenplay from his 1968 original, with few major changes. Filmed at the sprawling estate of Harlaxton Manor, with the interiors reconstructed on sound stages, the production cost $1.4 million, with O'Toole working for free (he was instead paid a great deal for the big-budget Man of La Mancha, released by the same studio later the same year).

The Ruling Class was the official British entry at the 1972 Cannes Film Festival.

Reception
The film divided critics. The New York Times described it as "fantastic fun" and Variety called it "brilliantly caustic", but the Los Angeles Times called it "snail-slow, shrill and gesticulating" and Newsweek said it was a "sledgehammer satire".
Jay Cocks called the screenplay a "snarling, overwrought and somewhat parochial satire on aristocracy and privileged morality"; he called the film "wretchedly photographed...as if it were shot under floodlights". In contrast Cocks praised the performances by Lowe, Mervyn, Browne, Alastair Sim and James Villiers, but reserved most of his praise for O'Toole, saying his performance is of "such intensity that it may trouble sleep as surely as it will haunt memory. All actors can play insanity; few play it well. O'Toole begins where other actors stop, with the unfocused gaze, the abrupt bursts of frenzied high spirits and precipitous depressions. Funny, disturbing, finally devastating, O'Toole finds his way into the workings of madness, revealing the anger and consuming anguish at the source." John Simon described The Ruling Class as  a "delightful satire".

Despite mixed critical reaction to the film, O'Toole's performance was universally praised and garnered  numerous prestigious awards and prizes, including an Academy Award nomination for Best Actor. Reportedly, when United Artists, its North American distributor, told producer Jules Buck that it would be cutting the film extensively for US release, Buck punched the company's London representative and bought the film back. Avco Embassy then bought the distribution rights and cut the film's 154-minute running time by six minutes.

The film was banned by the South African Publications Control Board.

In a review nearly 30 years after The Ruling Class was first released, Ian Christie said the film is "unashamedly theatrical, and it emerges from a particularly interesting period in English culture when theatre and cinema together were mining a rich vein of flamboyant self-analysis. Many stage works of this period cry out for filmic extension—in fact, Medak had just filmed a very different play that mingled fantasy and reality by a writer often bracketed with Barnes, Peter Nichols’ A Day in the Death of Joe Egg. But what makes The Ruling Class exceptional (and difficult for some) are its outrageous mixing of genres and its sheer ambition. Not only are there allusions to Shakespeare and Marlowe, but also to Wilde and Whitehall farce; to the gentility of Ealing Studios, with a plot that distantly evokes that other great black comedy Kind Hearts and Coronets, and to Hammer's gore-fests."

Awards and nominations 
1972 National Board of Review of Motion Pictures - Won NBR Award (Best Actor) - Peter O'Toole
1972 Cannes Film Festival - Nominated for the Palme d'Or
1973 Academy Awards - Nominated for the Academy Award for Best Actor - Peter O'Toole
1973 Golden Globe Awards - Nominated for the  Golden Globe for Best English Language Foreign Film

Subsequent history
In 1974, following an earlier-than-normal TV screening of the film on BBC Television that broke a gentlemen's agreement allowing a 'window' of theatrical distribution before any TV screening, the UK's Cinematograph Exhibitors' Association (the theatrical distributors' association) recommended its members blacklist all future movies produced by Jules Buck.

Embassy Pictures re-released the film in May 1983.

References

External links

 
 A Grade One, Galilee Miracle from yoism.org, with a film clip in which the O'Toole character claims that he is Jesus Christ and presents a "miracle"
The Ruling Class an essay by Ian Christie at the Criterion Collection

Films directed by Peter Medak
British black comedy films
1970s black comedy films
1972 comedy-drama films
British films based on plays
British comedy-drama films
1972 films
British plays
British satirical films
Films set in country houses
Films set in England
Films set in London
Films scored by John Cameron
Embassy Pictures films
United Artists films
1972 comedy films
1972 drama films
1970s English-language films
1970s British films